The oyster omelette, as known as o-a-tsian, o-chien or orh luak (Peng'im: o5 luah4) is a dish of Banlamese (both Hokkien and Teochew) origin that is renowned for its savory flavor in its native Minnan region and Chaoshan, along with Taiwan and many parts of Southeast Asia such as the Philippines, Thailand, Malaysia and Singapore due to the influence of the Banlamese diaspora, which derived many variations of the dish.

Summary 
The oyster omelette is a Taiwanese "night market favorite", and has constantly been ranked by many foreigners as the top dish from Taiwan. Its generous proportions and affordable price demonstrates the trait of night market cuisines. In the Philippines, English language menus often call the dish "oyster cake".

Ingredients 
The dish consists of an omelette with a filling primarily composed of small oysters. Starch (typically sweet potato starch) is mixed into the egg batter, giving the resulting egg wrap a thicker consistency. Pork lard is often used to fry the resulting omelet. Depending on regional variations, a savory sauce may then be poured on top of the omelette for added taste.

Spicy or chili sauce mixed with lime juice is often added to provide an intense kick. Shrimp can sometimes be substituted in place of oysters; in this case, it is called shrimp omelette.

Names 
In different Chinese languages, the "oyster omelette" is known by various names in different Chinese geographical regions.

Thailand 
In Thailand known as hoi thot, it was adapted to mussel omelettes (hoi malaeng phu thot), though the original oyster version (hot nang rom thot) also popular but higher price. In Bangkok, notable areas for oyster omelettes include Talat Wang Lang near Siriraj Hospital; Wang Lang (Siriraj) Pier in Bangkok Noi where there are two restaurants; Yaowarat neighborhood, where there is one Michelin-Bib Gourmand restaurant with Charoen Krung neighborhood in Bang Rak, among others. In 2017, the World Street Food Congress announced that oyster omelette is one of the three most notable street food among the street foods of Thailand.

Gallery

See also

 Night markets in Taiwan
 Hangtown fry
 Pad thai
 List of Chinese dishes
 List of egg dishes
 List of seafood dishes

References 

Teochew cuisine
Fujian cuisine
Singaporean cuisine
Taiwanese cuisine
Egg dishes
Malaysian cuisine
Thai cuisine
Omelettes
Oyster dishes